Varthemia is a genus of flowering plants in the family Asteraceae.

Varthemia iphionoides (also known as Chiliadenus iphinoides), is a small perennial shrub that belongs to the Varthemia genus. It grows in Palestine, Syria, Lebanon, Jordan and Sinai. It has various pharmacological properties including anti-diabetic, anti-oxidant, anti-platelet, and anti-bacterial effects.

References

Asteraceae genera
Inuleae
Medicinal plants